Busby may refer to:

Clothing 
Busby (military headdress), a kind of military headdress, made of fur, derived from that traditionally worn by Hussars.

Places
Busby, Alberta, a hamlet in Canada
Busby, East Renfrewshire, a village in Scotland
Busby Hall, a country house in North Yorkshire, England
Great Busby, a village in North Yorkshire, England
Little Busby, a civil parish in North Yorkshire, England

Australia
Busby, New South Wales, a suburb of Sydney
Busby Islet, South Australia

United States
Busby, Arkansas, an unincorporated community
Busby, Kansas, an unincorporated community
Busby, Montana, a census-designated place

People

Surname
Adam Busby (born 1948), Scottish terrorist
Alan T. Busby (1895–1992), American educator
Alexander Busby (politician) (1808–1873), English-born Australian politician
Allen Busby (1900–1988), American politician
Brian Busby (born 1962), Canadian literary historian and anthologist
Buzz Busby (1933–2003), stage name of American bluegrass musician Bernarr Graham Busbice
Christopher Busby (born 1945), controversial British scientist
Charles Busby (architect) (1786–1834), British architect
Charles Busby (politician), American engineer and politician
Cindy Busby (born 1983), Canadian actress
Dean Busby (born 1973), former rugby league footballer
Drew Busby (born 1947), Scottish former footballer
Duncan Busby (born 1983), English archer
F. M. Busby (1921–2005), American science fiction author
Francine Busby (born 1951), American politician
George H. Busby (1794–1869), American politician
Hector Busby (1932–2019), Māori navigator and traditional ship (waka) builder in New Zealand
James Busby (1801–1871), key figure in colonial New Zealand law and independence, pioneer of the Australian wine industry, son of John Busby
T. Jeff Busby (1884–1964), American politician
Jim Busby (1927–1996), American Major League Baseball player
John Busby (1765–1857), Australian mining engineer
Kathryn Busby, American television and film executive
Luke Busby (born 1981), British music producer and songwriter, son of Sid Busby
Margaret Busby (born 1940s), Ghanaian publisher, editor, writer and broadcaster based in the UK
Matt Busby (1909–1994), Scottish football player and manager
Mike Busby (born 1972), former Major League Baseball pitcher
Morris D. Busby (born 1938), American diplomat
Paul Busby (1918–2003), American Major League Baseball player
Richard Busby (1606–1695), English Anglican clergyman and headmaster of Westminster School
Rick Busby, American gospel singer
Siân Busby (1960–2012), British writer
Stephen Busby, British biochemist and professor
Steve Busby (born 1949), American Major League Baseball pitcher
Thomas Busby (disambiguation)
Viv Busby (born 1949), British former football player and manager
William Busby (priest) (1757–1820), Anglican Dean of Rochester
William Busby (politician) (1813–1887), English-born Australian politician

Given name
Busby Berkeley (1895–1976), American movie director and musical choreographer

See also
Busby Railway, a railway to the south of Glasgow, Scotland
Bubsy, a series of video games
busbee (1976-2019), American songwriter
Busbie, Scotland
Bushby, a village in Leicestershire, England 
Buzby, a talking cartoon bird, part of a marketing campaign by UK Post Office Telecommunications

English-language surnames